William Herbert Jarvis  (August 15, 1930 – April 26, 2016) was a Canadian politician.

Born in Hamilton, Ontario, Jarvis attended the London Central Collegiate Institute and the University of Western Ontario where he was a member of The Kappa Alpha Society.

A lawyer by profession, Jarvis was first elected to the House of Commons of Canada in the 1972 election as the Progressive Conservative Member of Parliament for Perth—Wilmot.

When the Tories came to power as a result of the 1979 election, Prime Minister Joe Clark appointed Jarvis to Cabinet as Minister of State for Federal-Provincial Relations.

Clark's minority government fell as a result of the budget's defeat in a motion of no confidence, and lost the subsequent 1980 election. Jarvis was re-elected in his riding. He retired from politics at the 1984 election.

Jarvis died in Cornwall, Ontario on April 26, 2016.

References

 

1930 births
2016 deaths
Canadian Anglicans
Lawyers in Ontario
Members of the 21st Canadian Ministry
Members of the House of Commons of Canada from Ontario
Members of the King's Privy Council for Canada
Politicians from Hamilton, Ontario
Progressive Conservative Party of Canada MPs
University of Western Ontario alumni
Western Law School alumni